This is a bibliography of works on military executions in World War I.

In English

 Babington, Anthony, For the Sake of Example: Capital Courts-Martial, 1914-1920, (London: Penguin. 2002) 
 Chielens, Piet & Putkowski, Julian; Unquiet Graves / Rusteloze Graven Guide: Execution Sites of the First World War in Flanders (UK: Francis Boutle Publishers, 2000) 
 Corns, Caroline & Hughes-Wilson, John; Blindfold and Alone (London, Cassell. 2001) 
 Corrigan, Gordon, Mud, Blood and Poppycock (London: Weidenfeld Military. 2004)  
 Godefroy, Andrew, For Freedom and Honour? The Story of 25 Canadians Executed During the Great War (Toronto: CEF Books, 1998) 
 Lister, David; Die Hard, Aby!, (England: Pen & Sword, 2005) 
 Moore, William, The Thin Yellow Line, (London: Wordsworth. 1999) 
 Oram, Gerard, Death Sentences passed by military courts of the British Army 1914–1924, (UK: Francis Boutle Publishers, 1999) 
 Oram, Gerard; Worthless Men: Race, eugenics and the death penalty in the British Army during the First World War, (UK: Francis Boutle Publishers, 1999) 
 Pugsley, Chris; On the Fringes of Hell (1991: Hodder & Stoughton) 
 Putkowski, Julian & Sykes, Julian; Shot at Dawn: Executions in World War One by Authority of the British Army Act, (England: Pen & Sword, 1996) 
 Putkowski, Julian; British Army Mutineers 1914-1922, (UK: Francis Boutle Publishers, 1998) 
 Putkowski, Julian; The Kinmel Park Camp riots 1919, (England: Flintshire Historical Society. 1989)  (however none of the rioters were executed)
 Sellers, Leonard; For God's Sake Shoot Straight! (Leo Cooper, London, UK, 1995) (an account of the trial and execution of Royal Navy officer Sub-Lt Edwin Dyett)
 Thurtle, Ernest; Military discipline and democracy, (London: Daniel Books. 1920)
 Thurtle, Ernest; Shootings at dawn: The Army death penalty at work, (Pamphlet)

In French
:fr:Soldat fusillé pour l'exemple
 Offenstadt, Nicolas; Les fusillés de la Grande Guerre (Paris: Éditions Odile Jacob, 1999)
 Pedroncini, Guy; Les mutineries de 1917, Presse universitaires de France, Paris, 1967
 Putkowski, Julian (trans. Yves Buffetaut); Les Fusillés de King Crater (II) (France: Ysec éditions, 2002) 
 Rolland, Denis; La grève des tranchées, Paris, Imago, 2005.

Executions
Military justice

Bibliographies of wars and conflicts